The 2013 FEU Tamaraws men's basketball team represented Far Eastern University during the 76th season of the UAAP men's basketball tournament that began on June 29, 2013. The Tamaraws finished the eliminations with a 10-4 record and placed third in the tournament after losing to DLSU in the semifinals.

Preseason results

Notable Games

UE Red Warriors
The Tamaraws played the season opener facing the Battle of the East rival and the much favored preseason Filoil champions UE Red Warriors.  The Tams found themselves trailing 21-11 at the end of the first quarter. The Warriors were mostly leading by double digits the entire first half until the Tams were able to claw their way back to cut the lead down to a single digit in the final 2 minute frame of the second quarter, 32-37. FEU started the second half on a 10-3 run to take advantage of the Warriors 42-40 in the first three minutes of the third quarter, only to end the momentum with Garcia committing an unsportsmanlike foul that gave the Warriors their own 7-0 surge to regain the lead 42-47. FEU scored the last six points to lead the Warriors 61-54 to end the third. FEU led as much as 15 in the fourth and went on to win the game, 89-78, their seventh straight win against the Warriors.

ADMU Blue Eagles
Leading by as much as 11 points in the fourth quarter, the Eagles came back with a 14-2 run to gain the lead, 58-57. FEU then scored three straight baskets for a 59-64 lead with over two minutes in the fourth but Elorde made a quick three to pull within two, 62-64. The game were tied at 66 with 10 seconds left in the game and eventually went to overtime after a Garcia miss. The Tams outscored the Eagles, 13-9 in overtime to get the win, 79-75, ending their six-game losing streak to the Eagles. Romeo scored six of the Tams' last eight points in the extra period.

Terrence Romeo was named the first Press Corps Player of the Week of the season averaging 21 points, 5.3 assists and two steals per game in wins over UE, Ateneo and UP.

Battle of the East, Round 2
Though FEU led almost the entire game with as much as 17, Sumang-led Red Warriors came back late in the fourth quarter taking advantage of FEU's lackluster defense and poor free throw shooting to tie the game at 70. The game went to overtime and the Warriors were in control in the extra period with a seven-point lead with 28 seconds in left, but was not able to cap off the win as they let the Tams score five straight points with Romeo completing a coast to coast finish and Mendoza stealing an inbound pass off of UE's Santos for a three-point marker putting the Tams within striking distance, 84-82. Sumang was fouled and missed one of his free throws with 13 seconds left, giving FEU the chance to tie the game only being down by three, 85-82. Tolomia hit the three pointer after faking a hand-off pass to Romeo and sends the game to its second overtime. The Tams showed dominance into the second overtime with a 98-94 win, snapping their two-game losing skid. The Warriors lost eight straight games to the Tamaraws.

Eliminations

References

FEU Tamaraws basketball seasons
Tam